Belkadi is an Algerian  surname. Notable people with the surname include:

 Aissa Belkadi, Algerian table tennis player
 Amina Belkadi (born 1992), Algerian judoka
 Jean Marc Belkadi, American jazz fusion guitarist
 Ridha Belkadi (1925-2012), Tunisian chess master

Arabic-language surnames